Kim Chi-wan (born 1 October 1968) is a former professional tennis player from South Korea.

Biography
Born in Ulsan, Kim is the youngest of three siblings and started playing tennis while in elementary school. 

He featured in a total of eight Davis Cup ties for South Korea, mostly as a doubles player. 

His regular doubles partner was Chang Eui-jong and the pair played together at the 1992 Summer Olympics in Barcelona, where they lost their first round match in five sets to Indonesia's Hary Suharyadi and Bonit Wiryawan. 

All of his ATP Tour main draw appearances came at his local tournament, the Korea Open in Seoul. Most notably he had a win over Kevin Curren in 1992 and was a doubles semi-finalist in 1993. 

At the 1994 Asian Games he and Chang Eui-jong were silver medalists in the men's doubles.

See also
List of South Korea Davis Cup team representatives

References

External links
 
 
 

1968 births
Living people
South Korean male tennis players
Sportspeople from Ulsan
Tennis players at the 1992 Summer Olympics
Olympic tennis players of South Korea
Medalists at the 1994 Asian Games
Asian Games medalists in tennis
Asian Games silver medalists for South Korea
Tennis players at the 1994 Asian Games
20th-century South Korean people